The enzyme D(−)-tartrate dehydratase catalyzes the chemical reaction

(S,S)-tartrate  oxaloacetate + H2O

This enzyme belongs to the family of lyases, specifically the hydro-lyases, which cleave carbon-oxygen bonds.  The systematic name of this enzyme class is (S,S)-tartrate hydro-lyase (oxaloacetate-forming). Other names in common use include D-tartrate dehydratase, and (S,S)-tartrate hydro-lyase.  It has 2 cofactors: iron,  and Manganese.

Structural studies

References

 
 

EC 4.2.1
Iron enzymes
Manganese enzymes
Enzymes of known structure